Gerwyn Stephen Price (born 7 March 1985) is a Welsh professional darts player and former professional rugby union and rugby league player. Nicknamed "The Iceman", he competes in events of the Professional Darts Corporation (PDC), where he is currently the World No. 4. He is a 3-time Grand Slam Champion and a former world champion, becoming the first ever Welshman to win the tournament. He is also a former world No. 1.

He broke into the top 32 on the PDC Order of Merit in 2016 and soon afterwards won his first Pro Tour title. In 2017, he was the runner-up at the UK Open, Price's first major event final, and has also competed in the prestigious Premier League Darts tournament on three occasions, finishing 10th, 5th, and 5th, in 2018, 2019, and 2020, respectively. Price took his first major win in controversial fashion at the 2018 Grand Slam of Darts tournament. He retained the title at the 2019 tournament, and won it again in 2021.

Price has also played rugby union for Welsh Premier Division sides Neath and Cross Keys, Pro12 with Glasgow Warriors and rugby league with South Wales Scorpions.

Rugby

Price played as a hooker for Welsh Premier Division sides Neath and Cross Keys as well as rugby league with South Wales Scorpions and Blackwood Bulldogs where he was capped by Wales Dragonhearts. He also had a short spell at Pro12 side Glasgow Warriors as injury cover for their first choice players. During Price's time with Cross Keys, they won the 2011–12 WRU Challenge Cup, with Price scoring a try in the final. He ended his rugby career in 2014 in order to concentrate on playing darts full-time.

Boxing
On 16 February 2022, Price announced on Instagram his debut boxing fight which was originally scheduled for 9 April 2022 against Rhys Evans at Valley Tavern, Blackwood, Wales. The boxing fight was later delayed due to injury and scheduled for 13 May 2022. Price later announced he would no longer be taking part in the event stating “I’ve pulled out of boxing now. On medical advice, I’ve been advised not to do it."

Darts
Price began playing darts for his local side Markham Welfare, before playing in the Super League for Aberbargoed. Welsh darts professional Barrie Bates advised him to enter Qualifying School to join the Professional Darts Corporation (PDC) in January 2014 and Price was successful in the second event. He won six matches on the day concluding with a 5–3 victory over Rowby-John Rodriguez to earn a two-year tour card. He qualified for the 2014 UK Open, and lost 5–2 to Aden Kirk in the second round. He twice reached the last 16 stage of Players Championship events during the first half of 2014, losing to Michael van Gerwen and Stephen Bunting. In July, Price averaged 98.32 in beating former world number one Colin Lloyd 6–2 at the European Darts Open. In the second round he led Gary Anderson 2–0 but went on to lose 6–3. At the 13th Players Championship, Price saw off Lloyd, Kirk, James Wade and Wayne Jones to advance to the quarter-finals for the first time, where he was edged out 6–5 by Adrian Lewis.

Price qualified for the European Darts Trophy in Leipzig during mid September. There, he beat Bernd Roith 6–3 in the first round to face Steve Beaton in the second round. Thanks to a great performance, which included the tournament's highest finish of 167, he saw off Beaton 6–3 and won against Vincent van der Voort  in the following round. He nearly qualified for the 2014 World Grand Prix, for which a place in the semi-finals was needed,  but was beaten 6–3 in the quarter-finals by Andy Hamilton. Price's impressive start to his darting career continued by reaching his first semi-final at the 19th Players Championship where he lost 6–3 to Ian White.

2015

The £12,750 he earned in Pro Tour events during 2014 saw him finish 39th on the Order of Merit to claim the eighth of sixteen places that were on offer to non-qualified players for the 2015 World Championship. Price missed one dart at tops to level at one set all against Peter Wright in the first round and was beaten 3–0. His successful year saw him start 2015 ranked world number 59.

Price was knocked out of the preliminary round of the 2015 UK Open 5–2 by Matt Padgett. On his way to his first quarter-final of the year, Price eliminated Adrian Lewis 6–4 with an average of 105.78 at the second Players Championship event, but he went on to lose 6–2 to James Wade. At the Gibraltar Darts Trophy, Price defeated two top 16 players in Robert Thornton and Simon Whitlock to play in his second career European Tour quarter-final, where compatriot Jamie Lewis narrowly won 6–5. In total during the first half of 2015 Price lost in four quarter-finals on the Pro Tour, and reached the semi-finals of the eighth Players Championship where he lost 6–4 to Adrian Lewis. These results sealed his qualification for the World Matchplay through the Pro Tour Order of Merit, with Price seeing off Michael Smith 10–4 in his debut in the event. He then produced the performance of his career to date as he defeated two-time world champion Lewis 13–10, but could only average 88.17 in his first major quarter-final during a 16–7 defeat by Peter Wright. Price met Smith again in the first round of the World Grand Prix with the tie going to a deciding set in which Price established a 2–0 leg lead. He would miss two match darts as Smith levelled and in the final leg Price was unable to score a point as he missed a total of 15 darts at doubles in the double-start event. He led Ian White 9–8 in the second round of the Players Championship Finals, but went on to lose 10–9.

2016
Andrew Gilding won each set in the first round of the 2016 World Championship by three legs to one in beating Price 3–0. In February at the fifth UK Open Qualifier, Price defeated Mark Webster 6–1 and Mensur Suljović 6–3 to reach his first PDC final, but he was denied the title by world number one Michael van Gerwen who triumphed 6–2. In the seventh Players Championship, Price won through to another final and this time took the title by coming back from 3–0 down against Peter Wright to win 6–3. He also took the eighth event as he averaged 108 in the final during a 6–1 victory over Jamie Caven. After knocking out Kim Huybrechts 10–8 at the World Matchplay, Price would face Adrian Lewis in the second round for the second year in a row. Before the match Lewis stated that Price's win over him 12 months ago was lucky and that Price was a "big mouth who's never won anything and never will win anything". The pre-match tension seemed to affect both players as both averaged in the 80s with Lewis prevailing 11–5. Price lost 2–0 in the first round of the World Grand Prix to Benito van de Pas, and 10–2 to Michael van Gerwen in the second round of the European Championship. Wins over Scott Waites and Robert Thornton saw him top his group on his debut at the Grand Slam of Darts. He missed one match dart against Brendan Dolan in the last 16 in a 10–9 defeat.

2017
After taking the opening set against Jonny Clayton in their first round match at the 2017 World Championship, Price lost three in a row to be beaten 3–1. He was ranked 20th on the Order of Merit afterwards. He defeated Justin Pipe 10–5, David Pallett 10–4 and Paul Hogan 10–6 at the UK Open to reach the quarter-finals. Ian White was on 20 to win 10–9, but hit a double 15 to burst his score and Price stepped in with a 160 checkout to progress through to the semi-finals where he was locked at 9–9 with Alan Norris. Norris missed three darts to take the 19th leg and Price finished 100 with two double tops, before breaking throw in the next to win 11–9. In his first major final he was 7–2 down to Peter Wright, before reducing his deficit to 8–6. However, Price then lost the last three legs to be beaten 11–6.

Victories over Finland, Ireland and Russia helped Price and Mark Webster into the semi-finals of the World Cup. A pair of 4–2 wins over the Belgian team of Kim and Ronny Huybrechts saw them play in the final, where their only point came courtesy of a Webster win over Raymond van Barneveld as they went down 3–1 to the Dutch.

2018
In the 2018 World Championship, Price won in the first round of the World Championship for the first time when he beat Ted Evetts 3–0. In the second round Price beat Ian White 4–1. In the third round Price faced the defending World Champion Michael van Gerwen. Van Gerwen won the first two sets but then Price won seven legs in a row to go two sets all and ahead in the fifth set. Price had set darts in the fifth set, but failed to take them. Van Gerwen won the fifth and sixth set which meant Price lost the match 2–4.

Following good performances over 2017 Price was selected as a wildcard for the 2018 Premier League Darts tournament. Despite good draws against world number 2 Peter Wright and 2017 World Grand Prix winner Daryl Gurney, Price failed to register a victory and was eliminated on week nine's judgement night at the Echo Arena Liverpool.

Price started to show some consistency in the televised majors in 2018, reaching the quarter finals of the Masters, UK Open, World Grand Prix and European Championship. He also won a European Tour event in September, the International Darts Open in Germany, just 2 months after having an operation to repair a broken achilles heel. In November, Price, as a 40/1 outsider at the start of the event, won his first televised PDC major by winning the Grand Slam of Darts, with come from behind wins against Simon Whitlock in the quarter finals and surviving match darts to win 16–15, against Mensur Suljović by 16–12 in the semi finals, and against Gary Anderson by 16–13 in the final. With his controversial Grand Slam of Darts victory, Price was the first Welshman to win a PDC televised major.

2019

In the 2019 World Championship, Price lost 3–2 to Nathan Aspinall in the second round despite leading 2-0 in sets.
In January 2019, Gerwyn Price was hit with a record fine by the Darts Regulation Authority due to his actions at the 2018 Grand Slam of Darts. In total he was fined £21,500 for his actions during his victory at the Grand Slam of Darts. He was fined £12,000 for gamesmanship in the final of the Grand Slam of Darts against Gary Anderson. He was fined £8,000 for gamesmanship in his quarter-final game against Simon Whitlock. He was also fined £1,500 for social media posts following his events, which were directed towards the beaten finalist Gary Anderson. His fine was reduced on appeal to a total of £11,500.

Gerwyn's second Premier League Darts campaign saw him just miss out on a play-off spot, as he finished 5th.

In October 2019, Price reached the final of the European Championship beating Ted Evetts, Nathan Aspinall, Vincent van der Voort and Michael Smith on the way. However, he lost the final to Rob Cross 11–6.

In November 2019, Price successfully defended his Grand Slam of Darts title beating Peter Wright 16–6 in the final after defeating Gary Anderson in the quarter-final and recording his first career win over Michael van Gerwen in the semi-final. Price then reached the final of the Players Championship, where he was the top seed due to his performances on the Pro Tour. He was narrowly beaten 11-9 by van Gerwen after missing four darts to take the match into a deciding leg.

2020
Price's 2019 season meant he entered the 2020 World Championship as the second favourite behind van Gerwen. He reached the semi-finals by defeating three-time BDO world champion Glen Durrant, but he was eventually defeated, in a heated encounter 6–3 by Peter Wright, who went on to win the title.

In March Price reached the 2020 UK Open final, his second UK Open final, losing to Michael van Gerwen 11–9. Price won two televised titles for the first time in 2020; winning the World Series of Darts Finals with a win over Rob Cross and winning the World Grand Prix by beating Dirk van Duijvenbode 5–2 in the final.

2021
Price went into the 2021 World Championship as third seed. He came thorough a last set decider against fellow Welshman Jamie Lewis and a sudden death last leg decider against 30th seed Brendan Dolan to reach the fourth round, where he won 4–1 against Mervyn King to reach the quarter-finals for the second consecutive year. He then beat Daryl Gurney in another last leg decider and beat Stephen Bunting 6–4 to set up a final clash with Gary Anderson. Price beat Anderson 7–3 to win his first PDC World Championship, and replaced Michael van Gerwen as world number one. He also became the first Welshman ever to win the PDC world championship, although Leighton Rees, Richie Burnett, Mark Webster and Wayne Warren had previously won the BDO version of the championship.

In April, Price was ruled out of the Premier League due to testing positive for COVID-19. During the 2021 UK Open, Price made it to the semi-finals losing 11–6 in legs to eventual winner James Wade. Wade would also take Price’s place in the Premier League following his positive COVID test. At the 2021 World Matchplay in July, he lost in the quarter-finals to Dimitri Van den Bergh. Price reached his first major final since the World Championship at the World Grand Prix which he lost to fellow Welshman Jonny Clayton 5–1 in sets.

In November 2021, Price won his third Grand Slam of Darts title by beating Peter Wright 16–8 in the final.

2022
In the 2022 World Championship, Price began the defence of his world crown against Ritchie Edhouse, winning 3–1. In the quarter-finals, Price hit a Nine-dart finish against Michael Smith, but went on to lose the match 5–4.

In the Premier League in Belfast, Price would go on to hit two further nine-dart legs. First against Michael van Gerwen in the semi-final and then a second against James Wade in the final.

At the World Matchplay Price made it to his first final at the Winter Gardens, hitting a 9 darter against Danny Noppert along the way. He eventually lost to Michael van Gerwen.

2023

In the 2023 World Championship, Price beat Luke Woodhouse, Raymond van Barneveld and José de Sousa to
reach the quarter-finals. In the quarter-finals, badly affected by noise in the crowd, he resorted to wearing ear defenders before losing 5–1 to Gabriel Clemens.

World Championship results

PDC
 2015: First round (lost to Peter Wright 0–3)
 2016: First round (lost to Andrew Gilding 0–3)
 2017: First round (lost to Jonny Clayton 1–3)
 2018: Third round (lost to Michael van Gerwen 2–4)
 2019: Second round (lost to Nathan Aspinall 2–3)
 2020: Semi-finals (lost to Peter Wright 3–6)
 2021: Winner (beat Gary Anderson 7–3)
 2022:  Quarter-finals (lost to Michael Smith 4–5)
 2023:  Quarter-finals (lost to Gabriel Clemens 1–5)

Career finals

PDC major finals: 13 (7 titles, 6 runners-up)

PDC World Series finals: 4 (1 title, 3 runner-ups)

PDC team finals: 3 (1 title, 2 runner-up)

Career statistics

(W) Won; (F) finalist; (SF) semifinalist; (QF) quarterfinalist; (#R) rounds 6, 5, 4, 3, 2, 1; (RR) round-robin stage; (Prel.) Preliminary round; (DNQ) Did not qualify; (DNP) Did not participate; (NH) Not held

Performance timeline

PDC

PDC European Tour

Personal life

In 2010, Price was punched outside a pub in Bargoed,  causing an injury which required 42 stitches to his forehead and five to his chin, as well as suffering a brain haemorrhage and nerve damage to an eyebrow. His attacker, Owen Body, received a 12-month jail term. Price also received a suspended jail sentence for assaulting Body on the same evening.

Following Price's controversial victory in the 2018 Grand Slam of Darts final, he spoke out about how his then-12-year-old daughter, Emily, had received online abuse on Twitter, in relation to his antics in the Grand Slam final. He called on his own followers to report the troll, and said that he wanted the culprit "kicked off of Twitter".

Nine-dart finishes

Notes

References

External links

1985 births
Living people
Cross Keys RFC players
Glasgow Warriors players
Grand Slam of Darts champions
Neath RFC players
PDC World Cup of Darts Welsh championship team
PDC world darts champions
Professional Darts Corporation current tour card holders
Rugby league players from Caerphilly County Borough
Rugby union players from Caerphilly County Borough
South Wales Scorpions players
Welsh darts players
Welsh rugby league players
Welsh rugby union players
World Grand Prix (darts) champions
World Series of Darts winners